John B. Hunt (born November 13, 1956) is an American politician in the state of New Hampshire. He is a member of the New Hampshire House of Representatives, sitting as a Republican from the Cheshire 11 district, having been first elected in 1986.

References

Living people
1956 births
Republican Party members of the New Hampshire House of Representatives
Politicians from Pittsburgh
People from Rindge, New Hampshire
Boston University alumni
20th-century American politicians
21st-century American politicians